Kristoffer Gudmund Nielsen (born 20 May 1985 in Brønshøj) is a Danish cyclist.

Palmares
2006
2nd Paris–Roubaix Espoirs
3rd Okolo Slovenska
1st Stage 1 
2007
2nd Tour de Normandie
3rd La Côte Picarde
2008
1st Okolo Slovenska
1st  Mountains Classification Danmark Rundt

References

1985 births
Living people
Danish male cyclists